Brajendra Singh Yadav is an Indian politician. He is a Member of the Madhya Pradesh Legislative Assembly representing Mungaoli for the Bhartiya Janata Party. He was first elected in the 2018 bypolls, after the demise of sitting MLA Mahendra Singh Kalukheda.

Personal life 
Mr Yadav was born to a noble social worker, politician and farmer Rao Gajram Singh Yadav & Prem Yadav in Amrod village. He started living in Surel village after being adopted by his father's elder brother Rao Govind Singh Yadav & Janki Yadav having no child. He is married to Mrs. Suvita Yadav and has two sons(Arjun Singh Yadav and Rahul Yadav) and one daughter(Priyanka Yadav). Arjun is a Chemical Engineering graduate from IIT Delhi and Rahul is pursuing his MBBS from Gandhi Medical College, Bhopal. Priyanka is a MBA Postgraduate from IPER Bhopal.

Political life 
Yadav started his political career in 2005 when he was elected unanimously to represent Amrod seat in Panchayat samiti (block). He started raising farmers issue and was made the District President of Kissan Congress. In 2010 Mrs Suvita Yadav was elected to represent the same Panchayat samiti (block) seat. She was elected as vice-president of Panchayat samiti unanimously.

Often considered as a humble politician without enemies, he is known for his unanimous elections at his Panchayat and Panchayat samiti.

He was first elected as MLA from Mungaoli Vidhansabha constituency after winning a by-election on 28 February 2018. He was again elected from same constituency on 11 December 2018 Assembly elections.

See also 
 Madhya Pradesh Legislative Assembly

References 

Madhya Pradesh MLAs 2018–2023
Indian National Congress politicians from Madhya Pradesh
Living people
1969 births